Muć is a village and a municipality in Croatia. It is part of the Split-Dalmatia County, located in the Zagora region near Sinj. The total population of the municipality is 4,074, and it is made up of 17 villages. 

The municipality is named after the twin villages of Gornji Muć (pop. 522) and Donji Muć (pop. 570). The largest single village is Neorić with 974 inhabitants.

Municipalities of Croatia
Populated places in Split-Dalmatia County